is a Japanese mezzotint engraver and painter.

Biography

Born in Koriyama, Japan in 1936, the youngest child of Iwaya Kanekichi and Kageyama Matsu, Toru Iwaya went, at the age of 19, to Tokyo. After he graduated from the Tokyo Fisheries (東京水産), now called Tokyo University of Marine Science and Technology (東京海洋大学), at the age of 24, he moved back to Koriyama, where in 1965 at the age of 29 he married Keiko Sugano.  In 1971 at the age of 35 he moved to Paris.

Toru Iwaya returned to Koriyama, Japan in 1999 due to his wife's deteriorating health and his sister's mental illness.  He continues his work and has begun teaching his techniques to young students at his workshop.

Awards
 Société des Artistes Français: bronze medal, 1972

Bibliography
 Uematsu, Hajime (ed.), Mezzotints by Toru Iwaya, with foreword by Masami Ono and introduction by Teizo Taki. Tokyo: Oscar Art Co. Ltd

References
 Toru Iwaya's Website
 Video of Toru Iwaya explaining how a mezzotint is made (Japanese)

1936 births
Living people
Artists from Fukushima Prefecture
Japanese artists